People's Alliance may refer to:

The People's Alliance (Volksunie), Belgian political party which split in 2001 into the Nieuw-Vlaamse Alliantie and Spirit
The People's Alliance (Bulgaria), a Bulgarian party from 1921 to 1923
The People's Alliance (Iceland), an electoral alliance in Iceland from 1956 to 1968 and a political party from 1968 to 1998
The Pakatan Rakyat, an informal Malaysian political coalition known as the People's Alliance
 People's Alliance (Maldives), a political party in the Maldives, created in 2008
 Progress Party (Russia), formerly known as the People's Alliance
The People's Alliance (Sri Lanka), a political front led by Sri Lanka Freedom Party
The People's Alliance (Spain), conservative political party in Spain, formed by a group of Franco's partisans after his death
 People's Alliance (Turkey), an electoral alliance in Turkey, established in February 2018 between the AKP and MHP
 The Peoples Alliance , a 2003 UK political party re-formed as The New Party
 The People's Alliance (Durham, NC), a progressive grassroots consumer watchdog organization in North Carolina
 The People's Alliance (Fiji), a Fijian political party

See also
 People's Alliance Party (disambiguation)
 People's Alliance of New Brunswick, a political party in Canada, created in 2010
 People's Alliance for Democracy, a Thai political movement and pressure group
 United People's Freedom Alliance, Sri Lanka